Cliffside may refer to:

 Cliffside (Palisades, New York), a historic home
 Cliffside (Scottsville, Virginia), a historic home
 Cliffside, North Carolina, United States, an unincorporated community
 Cliffside, Texas, United States, an unincorporated community
 Cliffside, Toronto, Canada, a neighborhood

See also
 Cliffside Hose Company No. 4
 Cliffside Lake Recreation Area
 Cliffside Park, New Jersey
 Cliffside Railroad
 Cliffside railway station